Frances Segelman, Lady Petchey (born 1949) is an English sculptor.

Born in Leeds, Segelman is a friend of the Royal Society of Arts, and an Associate of the Royal Society of British Sculptors and is well known for her busts of royalty and celebrity personalities. Amongst others she has sculpted busts of Queen Elizabeth II, the Duke of Edinburgh, Joan Collins, Joanna Lumley, Bruce Forsyth, Eamonn Holmes, David Frost, Sven-Göran Eriksson, Jack Rosenthal, Cherie Blair, and John Profumo. In 1999, her statue of Leeds United legend Billy Bremner was unveiled at Elland Road.

Marriage
In February 2016, she married 90 year old philanthropist and businessman, Sir Jack Petchey.

References

External links
 Official website

1949 births
Living people
British sculptors
British women sculptors
Artists from Leeds
Modern sculptors
21st-century British women artists
Wives of knights
Date of birth missing (living people)